The Mid-American Conference softball tournament was the conference softball championship of the Mid-American Conference, a Division I member of the National Collegiate Athletic Association (NCAA).  The top eight finishers participated in the double-elimination tournament, which was most recently played at Firestone Stadium in Akron, Ohio, from 2008 through 2019.  The winner of the tournament received an automatic berth to the NCAA Division I softball championship.  The tournament began in 1982, but was discontinued after 1986. It resumed in 1996 and was held annually through 2019. It was scheduled to be played in May 2020, but was cancelled in March 2020 due to the coronavirus pandemic. As part of several changes announced in May 2020 related to the pandemic, the tournament was eliminated along with the post-season tournaments of seven other sports, for at least four seasons. Central Michigan won the most tournament titles with 10, followed by Miami with four.

History
The Mid-American Conference added softball as a varsity sport for the 1982 season, but regular-season conference play did not begin until 1983. The first tournament in 1982 featured all ten conference members, with two rounds of single-elimination play, followed by double-elimination rounds with the final four teams. The following year, 1983, it became a double-elimination tournament featuring the top six teams in conference play, then was reduced to the top four teams for the 1984, 1985, and 1986 tournaments. This format remained in place when the tournament was resumed in 1996 and again in 1997. From 1998 through 2004, the format was expanded to include the top six teams in conference play, and since 2005 it has included the top eight teams.  

From the 1983 tournament through 2001, all rounds were held at the home field of the regular-season overall conference champion, with the inaugural 1982 tournament being held at Ebert Field on the campus of Western Michigan University. Beginning in 2002, the tournament was held at Firestone Stadium in Akron, Ohio, where it was held through 2005. After two seasons at Currie Stadium in Midland, Michigan, the tournament returned to Firestone Stadium in 2008, where it remained until the tournament was eliminated.

Champions

By year
The following is a list of tournament champions and sites listed by year.

By school
The following is a list of tournament champions listed by school and the years each team was eligible to play in the tournament.

References